Wolfgang H. Scholz (born 5 October 1958) is a German painter, photographer and film director. He lives and works in Mexico City and Munich.

Life 

Scholz was born and grew up in Dresden, in a family that had been dedicated to woodcraft for several generations. At the beginning of the 1980s he studied building engineering and painting / graphic arts in Dresden. He studied additionally graphology from 1987 to 1988 with Ingeborg Rudolph in Leipzig. In 1989 he went to Munich, where he had an teaching position from 1990 to 1991 at the University of Television and Film (HFF). He works since 1992 for different European TV-broadcasters, for instance Bayerischer Rundfunk, the Mitteldeutscher Rundfunk, the Zweites Deutsches Fernsehen and ARTE. 1994 he founded together with Meinhard Prill the film production company Sic! Film GmbH and shot his first theatrical feature film “Shadow Seeker”, a story about his childhood in Dresden.
His artistic work is conceptually tied to photography, as well as multimedia installations and is basically figurative in the area of painting. Connecting elements are movement, time and space, that brought him to create multimedia performances with dancers.
2001 Scholz went to Mexico City. He is married to the Mexican dancer, choreographer and manager of the Centro Cultural "Los Talleres" Isabel Beteta De Cou in Mexico City.
In 2013 he was appointed at the Saxon Academy of Arts, Germany. The film museum of the University UNAM and the Museum Chopo (Mexico City) presented 2016 and 2017 a retrospective of his works.

Selection of solo exhibitions 
2017	Gallery The Clemente, New York City
	Museum Chopo, Mexico City
2016	Filmotéca UNAM, Mexico City
2015	Museum of Art, Querétaro, Mexico
2014	Goethe Institut, Mexico City
	Gallery Blanco, Buenos Aires, Argentina
2013	Cultural Center Borges, Buenos Aires, Argentina
	Theater Montes de Oca, San José, Costa Rica
	La Casona Municipal, Córdoba, Argentina
2012	Museum Regional, Guadalajara, Mexico
2011	Museum Ex-Convento del Carmen, Guadalajara, Mexico
	Gallery José María Velasco, Mexico City, Mexico
2010	Gallery UAM Iztapalapa, Mexico City
	Gallery Estación Coyoacán of Modern Art, Mexico City
2009	Neuer Sächsischer Kunstverein (mit Gerda Lepke), Dresden
	Museum del Arzobispado, Mexico City
2008	Gallery „Seminario de Cultura Méxicana“, Mexico City 
2005	Museum del Chopo, Mexico City
1994	Black Box, Gasteig, Munich, Germany
1991	Gallery Carl Baasel, Starnberg, Germany

Selection of group exhibitions 

2017	Savvy Contemporary, Berlin
	Haus des Buches, Leipzig, Germany
2015	Museum Chopo, Mexico City
	City Hall, Dresden, Germany
2014	Museum dos Correo, Rio de Janeiro, Brazil
	Museum dos Correo, Brasilia, Brazil
	Gallery Nuett, Dresden, Germany
	Center of Contemporary Arts, Rosario, Argentina
2013	BBK Gallery, Munich, Germany
2012	Gallery Vértice, Guadalajara, Mexico
2008	Museum für Kunst und Geschichte, Ciudad Juárez, Mexico
2006	Gallery Metropolitana, Mexico City
1995	Festival der A*Devantgarde im Neuen Theatre, Munich 
	Kunst Messe, Gallery Walter Bischoff, Los Angeles, USA
1993	Theaterhaus, Stuttgart
	"20 Munich Artist", Old City Hall Munich
1991	Gallery Walter Bischoff, Stuttgart, Germany
1990	"Ausgebürgert", Albertinum, Dresden, Germany
1989	BBK Gallery, Munich, Germany

Selection of multimedia performances 
2017	El Vacio – The Void
	Foro CC Los Talleres , Mexiko-Stadt
2013	Melancholy – Part 1
	Museum Ex-Teresa Contemporary Arts, Mexico City
	Theater Montes de Oca, San José, Costa Rica
	Center of Contemporary Arts, Rosario, Argentina
2013	The Inner Labyrinth
	Museum Ex-Teresa Arte Actual, Mexico City
	Theatre Nacional, San José, Costa Rica
	Center of Contemporary Arts, Rosario, Argentina
2005	Ser Viviente (Life-Beings)
	Museum del Chopo, Mexico City
	Theatre Centro Cultural „Los Talleres“, Mexico City
2002	Cicles
	Theatre of the Instituto Peruano-Norteamericano Lima, Peru
	Theatre Miguel Covarrubias (UNAM), Mexico City
	Theatre de la Danza, Mexico City
2001	Landscapes of Love
	Clemente Soto Velez Cultural Center, New York City, USA
	Fringe Festival for Independent Dance Toronto, Canada
	National Theatre Havanna, Cuba
	Centro Fotográfico „Álvarez Bravo“, Oaxaca, Mexico
	Theatre de la Danza, Mexico City
	Centro de la Imagen, Mexico City

Selection of films 
Source:

Time of Crows (2014) theatrical feature film
The Image Inside (2009) theatrical documentary
Distant Neighbours (2003) documentary
Lost Wings (1999) theatrical feature film
The Real Dream (1995) documentary 
Shadow Seeker (1994) theatrical documentary-fiction film
The Lithographer von Otto Dix (1992) documentary
Kohlenlothar (1989/90) documentary
Body Building (1988) documentary
Dream 1 (1986) shortfilm / fiction film

Selection of awards 
Source:

2016 Gold Remi Award, International Film Festival Houston, USA
2015 Award (Drehbuch), Int. Filmmaker Festival, Milan, Italy
2010 Platinum Remi Award, International Film Festival Houston, USA
2004 Saxon Journalist Award (First Prize)
2000 Silver Award, International Film Festival Houston, USA
1991 International Film Festival Dresden (First Prize)

References 

 Kohlmeyer, Agnes (2004). “Flaming Red” Catalogue, A Workbook 2005, Venecia, Italy
 Pérez y Pérez, Rafael Alfonso (2008). "La Deconstrucción del Mundo Real", Museum Arzobispado, Mexico City 
 Lozano, Ernesto (2011). "Laberinto Racional" La Razon de Artes Visuales, Mexico City
 Zavala Alonso, Manuel (2016). "Time of Crows" Art and History of Mexico City

External links 
 
 
 Member at the Association of Professional Visual Artists Germany (BBK) Munich
 Member at the Sächsischer Künstlerbund

1958 births
20th-century German painters
20th-century German male artists
German male painters
21st-century German painters
21st-century German male artists
Photographers from Dresden
Living people
Artists from Dresden